A breviary (Latin: breviarium) is a liturgical book used in Christianity for praying the canonical hours, usually recited at seven fixed prayer times.

Historically, different breviaries were used in the various parts of Christendom, such as Aberdeen Breviary, Belleville Breviary, Stowe Breviary and Isabella Breviary, although eventually the Roman Breviary became the standard within the Roman Catholic Church (though it was later supplanted with the Liturgy of the Hours); in other Christian denominations such as the Lutheran Churches, different breviaries continue to be used, such as The Brotherhood Prayer Book.

Different breviaries 
   
In the Catholic Church, Pope Nicholas III approved a Franciscan breviary, for use in that religious order, and this was the first text that bore the title of breviary. However, the "contents of the breviary, in their essential parts, are derived from the early ages of Christianity", consisting of psalms, Scripture lessons, writings of the Church Fathers, as well as hymns and prayers.

The ancient breviary of the Bridgettines had been in use for more than 125 years before the Council of Trent and so was exempt from the Constitution of Pope Pius V which abolished the use of breviaries differing from that of Rome.

In 2015, The Syon Breviary of the Bridgettines was published for the first time in English (from Latin). This was done in celebration of the 600th anniversary of Syon Abbey, founded in 1415 by King Henry V. Following the Oxford Movement in the Anglican Communion, in 1916, the Anglican Breviary was published by the Frank Gavin Liturgical Foundation.

In Lutheranism, the Diakonie Neuendettelsau religious institute uses a breviary unique to the order; For All the Saints: A Prayer Book for and by the Church, among many other breviaries such as The Daily Office: Matins and Vespers, Based on Traditional Liturgical Patterns, with Scripture Readings, Hymns, Canticles, Litanies, Collects, and the Psalter, Designed for Private Devotion or Group Worship, are popular in Lutheran usage as well.

In Oriental Orthodox Christianity, the canonical hours of the Syriac Orthodox Church and the Indian Orthodox Church are contained within the Shehimo breviary; the Coptic Orthodox Church of Alexandria has the Agpeya breviary and the Armenian Apostolic Church has the Sharagnots or Zhamagirk (cf. Octoechos (liturgy)#Armenian Šaraknoc'). The Assyrian Church of the East has its own 7 canonical hours. 

In the Eastern Orthodox Church, the Divine Office is found in the Horologion.

See also 

 Book of hours
 Christian liturgy 
 Direction of prayer
 Fixed prayer times
 Hygiene in Christianity
 Missal

References

External links 

The 1911 Roman Breviary in Latin and English
 The Syon Breviary — Daily Office of Our Lady — (Bridgettine) Now in English
The Anglican Breviary
 Lewis E 49 Breviary at OPenn
 Lewis E 50 Breviary, Use of Ghent at OPenn
Lewis E 51 Breviary at OPenn
 Lewis E 52 Breviary at OPenn
 Lewis E 236 Breviary at OPenn
 Lewis E 256 Breviary, Cistercian use at OPenn
 MS 240/15 Breviary, Cistercian Use at OPenn
 MS 75 Breviary, Paris, ca. 1260-1300 at Library of Congress

 
Christian prayer books

Christian liturgical texts
Christian literary genres